Mohammed Al-Marri (Arabic:محمد المري) (born 20 February 1994) is a Qatari footballer.

External links
 

Qatari footballers
1994 births
Living people
Al-Sailiya SC players
Qatar Stars League players
Association football midfielders